Parallelism may refer to:

 Angle of parallelism, in hyperbolic geometry, the angle at one vertex of a right hyperbolic triangle that has two hyperparallel sides
 Axial parallelism, a type of motion characteristic of a gyroscope and astronomical bodies
 Conscious parallelism or also tacit parallelism, price-fixing between competitors that occurs without any communication between the parties
 Parallel computing, the simultaneous execution on multiple processors of different parts of a program
 In the analysis of parallel algorithms, the maximum possible speedup of a computation
 Parallel evolution, the independent emergence of a similar trait in different unrelated species
 Parallel (geometry), the property of parallel lines
 Parallelism (grammar), a balance of two or more similar words, phrases, or clauses
 Parallelism (rhetoric), the chief rhetorical device of Biblical poetry in Hebrew
 Psychophysical parallelism, the theory that the conscious and nervous processes vary concomitantly
 Parallel harmony/doubling, or harmonic parallelism, in music

See also
 Parallel (disambiguation)